Anguerny is a former commune in the Calvados department in the Normandy region of northwestern France. On 1 January 2016, it was merged into the new commune of Colomby-Anguerny.

The inhabitants of the commune are known as Agernynois or Agernynoises

Geography
Anguerny is located 10 kilometres north-west of Caen and 3 kilometres south of Douvres-la-Delivrande. The D79 from Caen passes through the west of the commune and continues to Basly. The D7 from Caen to Douvres-la-Delivrande passes just to the east of the commune. Access to the commune is by the D141 which links the D79 to the D7 passing through the village and the commune. Apart from the village the commune is entirely farmland.

History
The commune was called successively Aguerne then Aguerny before taking its current name. The parish was under the authority of the Lords of Creully.

Heraldry

Administration

List of Successive Mayors

Twinning

Anguerny has twinning associations with:
 East Woodhay (United Kingdom) since 1997.

Demography

In 2013 the commune had 754 inhabitants.

Sites and monuments
The Church of Saint Martin Bell Tower (11th century) is classified as an historical monument. The church contains four items that are registered as historical objects:
A Tabernacle and Seating (19th century)
A Painting: Calvary (17th century)
A Retable (17th century)
The main Altar: The Crucifixion (1760)
A Tithe barn
2 Festival halls

Saint Martin Church Picture Gallery

Activities and events
The Romanes d'Anguerny is held every two years in spring.

See also
Communes of the Calvados department

References

External links
Anguerny official website 
Anguerny on Géoportail, National Geographic Institute (IGN) website 
Aguerny on the 1750 Cassini Map

Former communes of Calvados (department)
Populated places disestablished in 2016